The Jouby's are a French soulsteady (reggae, soul, ska, rocksteady and a bit of rock) vocal band originally formed in 2004 in Bordeaux, Aquitaine.

Formation
The Jouby's are a French soulsteady band originally formed in 2004 in Bordeaux, Aquitaine as a vocal trio. 
The band started out singing popular American and Jamaican black soul melodies of the 60's in local clubs, most notably at "Comptoir du Jazz" and "Dibiteri".

In 2007 they were joined by a banking-band of three (3) musicians, originally known as the Train's Tone, Niominka'bi and Duke bank.
Since then The Jouby's continued playing and working on their material combining reggae, soul, ska, rocksteady and a bit of rock. They have embarked on several tours in France and Italy, as well as performed at summer festivals in Italy and the South of France.

Influences
 Toots & the Maytals
 The Temptations
 Ken Boothe
 Otis Redding

London Busking (2010)
On February 15, 2010 the band release their first album London Buskin, on an independent French label Soulbeats Records. The album has 13 rock / soul tracks composed by the members of the band.

Track listing
 Metroduction - 00:49
 London Busking - 3:33
 Choose Me - 3:38
 Be Yourself - 3:16
 Coeur a Coeur - 3:30
 Sexual Breakdown - 5:59
 Sweety Steady Music - 4:13
 Menteur - 5:25
 Such a Bunch of Trouble - 5:22
 Faut Choisir - 4:56
 Love Is Not a Game - 5:19
 Angel - 3:54
 Lord - 5:09

Band members
 Quentin (Couby) Imola   - vocals, song-writing (2004–present)
 Jonathan (Jouby) Joubert - guitar, vocals, song-writing (2004–present)
 Guillaume (Gouby) Pailhère - vocals, song-writing (2004–present)
 Eric Delsaux - keyboards - member of Train's Tone, Niominka’bi and Duke (2007–present)
 Cédric Verdier - bass - member of Train's Tone, Niominka’bi and Duke (2007–present)
 Stéphane Garcia - drums and percussion - member of Train's Tone, Niominka’bi and Duke (2007–present)

Discography

 2010: London Busking

References

French rock music groups
French reggae musical groups
Musical groups established in 2004
Musical groups from Bordeaux